The Tomb of Heydar Yaghma is built by the Government of the Islamic Republic of Iran and This building is located in Nishapur.

Sources 

Mausoleums in Iran
Tourist attractions in Razavi Khorasan Province